is an autobahn in western Germany, connecting Münster via Recklinghausen to Wuppertal. It is an important bypass for traffic coming from the A 1 wanting to go to the western Ruhr valley and wanting to avoid tailbacks at the Kamener Kreuz near Dortmund.

Exit list

|-
|colspan="3"|

 
 
 
 

 

 
  

 

 

 

|}

External links

43
A043